Rija Rakotomandimby (born 21 November 1982) is a Malagasy footballer with Fanilo Japan Actuels in his home country. He is also a member of the Madagascar national football team.

External links

1982 births
Living people
Malagasy footballers
Madagascar international footballers

Association football midfielders
USCA Foot players
Japan Actuel's FC players
SO Emyrne players
FC BFV players